Tnúthgal mac Artrach (died c. 807) or Tuathal mac Artroig was a supposed King of Munster from the Glendamnach branch of the Eóganachta. He was the son of Artrí mac Cathail (died 821), also King of Munster.

Mentioned in some king lists, it is possible that his father ordained him as king to rule with him during his reign. He is not mentioned in the Irish annals.

Notes

References 

 Byrne, Francis John (2001), Irish Kings and High-Kings, Dublin: Four Courts Press,

External links
CELT: Corpus of Electronic Texts at University College Cork

Kings of Munster
9th-century Irish monarchs
800s deaths
Year of birth unknown